Kerteminde Municipality is a municipality (Danish, kommune) in Region of Southern Denmark on the northeast coast of the island of Funen in central Denmark.  The municipality includes the island of Romsø, and it covers an area of 203 km2.  It has a total population of 24,034 (2022). The main town and the site of its municipal council is the town of Kerteminde.

Ferry service connects the municipality to the island of Romsø from the harbour in the town of Kerteminde.

History 
 Dalby Parish
 Drigstrup Parish
 Kerteminde Parish
 Kølstrup Parish
 Mesinge Parish
 Revninge Parish
 Rynkeby Parish
 Stubberup Parish
 Viby Parish

On 1 January 2007 Kerteminde Municipality was, as the result of Kommunalreformen ("The Municipal Reform" of 2007), merged with existing Munkebo and Langeskov municipalities to form an enlarged Kerteminde municipality.

Geography 
The Kerteminde Fjord flows through Kerteminde town and divides the easternmost part of the municipality into two segments. In the west, an isthmus near Munkebo connects the two areas. The fjord is a segment of the Great Belt. This results in the northern portion of the municipality being located on a peninsula, surrounded by water on three sides:  
 The Great Belt (Storebælt), the strait which separates Funen from the island of Zealand, to the east;traversed by the Great Belt Fixed Link bridges and train tunnels
 The Kattegat to the north
 The Kattegat and Odense Fjord to the west.

Locations

Politics
Kerteminde's municipal council consists of 25 members, elected every four years. The municipal council has six political committees.

Municipal council
Below are the municipal councils elected since the Municipal Reform of 2007.

References 

 Municipal statistics: NetBorger Kommunefakta, delivered from KMD aka Kommunedata (Municipal Data)
 Municipal mergers and neighbors: Eniro new municipalities map

External links 

Kerteminde municipality  
 Portal for the town of Kerteminde
 Kerteminde tourist bureau

 
Municipalities of the Region of Southern Denmark
Municipalities of Denmark
Populated places established in 2007